Big Sky Ranch is a movie ranch in Simi Valley, California, that is used for the filming of Western television series and motion pictures, among other projects. The Ventura County Cultural Heritage Board designated several of these buildings County Landmark #71 in July 1981. The ranch is within the Los Angeles Studio Zone.

History
The site is part of the  (19.5 sq.mi.) ranch purchased by the Patterson Ranch Co. in 1903 to raise grain, cattle, hogs and sheep. J. Paul Getty bought the ranch in the 1930s. After purchasing the ranch in 1981, Watt Enterprises named it Big Sky Ranch. Many of the sets were destroyed by a wildfire in 2003.

Productions
Television episodes and productions filmed at Big Sky Ranch include: Rawhide, Gunsmoke, Little House on the Prairie, Highway to Heaven, Father Murphy, Carnivàle, The Thorn Birds, The Yellow Rose, Tales from the Crypt and Westworld. 

Films shot at the location include Coming to America (1988), Sidekicks (1974), The Gambler Returns: The Luck of the Draw (1991), Siringo (1996) and Annabelle: Creation (2017).

References

External links

Movie ranches
Economy of Simi Valley, California
Buildings and structures in Simi Valley, California
Companies based in Ventura County, California